kari edwards (December 2, 1954 – December 2, 2006) was a poet, artist and gender activist. Her name is written all lowercase. She won the New Langton Arts Bay Area Award in literature (2002) and posthumously won a Lambda Literary Award.

She authored have been blue for charity (BlazeVox: 2006); obedience (Factory School: 2005); iduna (O Books:
2003); a day in the life of p (subpress collective: 2002);  a diary of lies, Belladonna #27 (Belladonna Books: 2002); obLiqUE paRt(itON): colLABorationS (xPress(ed): 2002); and post/(pink) (Scarlet Press: 2000).

edwards's work has appeared in numerous publications, such as anthologies Blood and Tears: Poems for Matthew Shepard, Painted leaf Press (2000), and Electric Spandex: anthology of writing the queer text (Pyriform Press: 2002). Her works have also been exhibited throughout the U.S.

A posthumous book of edwards' poetry, succubus in my pocket, published in 2015 by EOAGH won a 2016 Lambda Literary Award in the category of Transgender Poetry.

Death
She died of a pulmonary embolism, aged 52, on December 2, 2006.

Books/E-books
A Day in the Life of P, A is for Arts (2002) 
Iduna, O Books (2003) 
have been blue for charity, Blaze Vox Books (2006) 
Bharat_jiva, Dusie Press (2006)
Obedience, Factory School (2008) 
succubus in my pocket, EOAGH (2015) 
dôNrm’-lä-püsl, Punctum Books (2017)

References

External links
kari edwards on the Poets' Corner
Interview at Rain Taxi
Interview at Chicago Postmodern Poetry
kari's blog
back in amerika...and getting ready to leave again, DELIRIOUSHEM
Editorial for EOAGH Issue 3: Queering Language
Review of iduna

1954 births
2006 deaths
Feminist artists
English-language poets
Place of birth missing
American LGBT poets
American women poets
20th-century American poets
20th-century American women writers
Transgender poets
Lambda Literary Award winners
American women artists
Naropa University alumni
20th-century LGBT people
American transgender writers